Jess French is a British television personality, veterinarian and author. She is the presenter of a television programme called Minibeast Adventure with Jess which has aired on CBeebies. French is also a best-selling author of more than 20 books and a regular contributor to science and literary festivals such as Hay Festival, Edinburgh festival and Norwich Science Festival and printed press such as The Guardian, BBC Wildlife, The Week.

TV career
French has worked on a number of shows as a wildlife (in particular creepy-crawly) expert including, Live 'n' Deadly (CBBC), Deadly Mission Madagascar (CBBC), Springwatch (BBC) and Micro Monsters 3D (Sky). Since April 2014 she has presented a series of twenty 9-minute episodes of Minibeast Adventure with Jess on the Cbeebies channel. She has also appeared on The Pets Factor, BBC Breakfast, Sunday Brunch and Springwatch. In December 2022, French appeared alongside Ken Follett, Ria Lina and Susan Collins (artist) on the University Challenge Christmas special, representing University College London.

Radio 
French co-presents a radio series with Ben Garrod for BBC Radio 4 called Wild Inside, in which she carries out post mortem examinations on exotic species and discusses her findings.

On 12 August 2019, she appeared on the podcast Trees A Crowd with David Oakes.

Education 
French has degrees in zoology (from University College London), veterinary science and veterinary medicine and surgery (from University of Nottingham).

Books
French is one of the UK's top-selling authors of non-fiction books for children. She usually writes on the theme of animals, nature and the environment. In August 2020 she released her debut picture book.

French was one of the 2021 World Book Day authors, with her title 'Protect the Planet', published by DK (publisher).
 Fluttering Minibeast Adventures (Feb 2016)
 Tickly Minibeast Adventures (Feb 2016)
 Born Free Chimp Rescue:  The True Story of Chinoise (May 2016)
 Born Free Bear Rescue (September 2017)
 Born Free Cheetah Rescue (November 2017)
 Minibeasts with Jess French (February 2018)
 How to Help a Hedgehog and Protect a Polar Bear (Aug 2018)
 Saving Species (October 2018)
 What a Waste (April 2019)
 Lost Species (October 2019)
 The Book of Brilliant Bugs (March 2020)
 Slow Down, Monkey (Aug 2020)
 Let's Save Our Planet: Forests: Uncover the Facts. Be Inspired. Make A Difference (October 2020)
Protect the Planet - World Book Day book (March 2021)
 Earth's Incredible Oceans (April 2021)
Cat Chat (July 2021)
How to Be a Vet and Other Animal Jobs (July 2021)
Puppy Talk (Jan 2022)
It's a Wonderful World (March 2022)
Bella Loves Bugs (April 2022)
Billy Loves Birds (April 2022)
My Mum is a Spy - with Andy McNab. (August 2022)

Awards
French won the Jane Goodall Global Youth Leadership award in 2010 for setting up a program to teach children about environmental issues.

In 2015, French was named number 43 on BBC Wildlife magazine's Power List of conservation heroes.

French's book 'Fluttering Minibeast Adventures' was nominated for the 2017 Educational Writers' Award.

In 2022, French's book 'Earth's Incredible Oceans' won a Gold Nautilus Award and 'It's a Wonderful World' was named 'Top Value Toy' in the 2022 Right Start awards.

Early life
French has lived across the world, from Chile to Thailand.  She grew up in Norfolk and studied at Norwich School. She gained a first class degree in zoology at University College London where she was active in the volunteering department, winning awards for her work teaching children about conservation and for setting up a sign language society. She has studied primates across the world and has a particular interest in gorillas. She gained her degree in veterinary medicine and surgery from the University of Nottingham and she now works as a small animal and zoo vet. She can speak fluent Spanish and can use British Sign Language.

References

Women zoologists
British children's television presenters
People educated at Norwich School
Alumni of University College London
British non-fiction writers